The Methodist Episcopal Church built in 1910 is an historic Methodist church located at 117 Central Avenue, North in  Pierre, South Dakota. The original congregation,  which dates from 1880, moved  in 1881 from rented halls to its first building on Fort Street. In 1883 it moved to a building on the present Central Avenue site. The present Late Gothic Revival-style building was built in 1910. It was designed by John P. Eisentraut of the Black Hills Company, architects of Deadwood, and built by parishioner F. Turner. It "included space for the first library in Pierre, a gymnasium, and a plunge pool." On May 9, 1997, the 1910 building was added to the National Register of Historic Places. It is now the  Pierre First United Methodist Church.
In February 2012, Reverend Dan Bader was announced as the new Senior Pastor.

References

External links
 Pierre First United Methodist Church website

Churches on the National Register of Historic Places in South Dakota
Methodist churches in South Dakota
Buildings and structures in Pierre, South Dakota
National Register of Historic Places in Pierre, South Dakota
Methodist Episcopal churches in the United States